Marius Halvor Skram-Jensen (1 March 1881 – 17 January 1975) was a Danish gymnast who competed in the 1906 Summer Olympics.

In 1906, he won the silver medal as a member of the Danish gymnastics team in the team competition.

References

External links
profile

1881 births
1975 deaths
Danish male artistic gymnasts
Olympic gymnasts of Denmark
Gymnasts at the 1906 Intercalated Games
Olympic silver medalists for Denmark

Medalists at the 1906 Intercalated Games